Supplementing the medical model of depression, many researchers have begun to conceptualize ways in which the historical legacies of racism and colonialism create depressive conditions. Given the lived experiences of marginalized peoples, ranging from conditions of migration, class stratification, cultural genocide, labor exploitation, and social immobility, depression can be seen as a "rational response to global conditions", according to Ann Cvetkovich.

Psychogeographical depression overlaps somewhat with the theory of "deprejudice", a portmanteau of depression and prejudice proposed by Cox, Abramson, Devine, and Hollon in 2012, who argue for an integrative approach to studying the often comorbid experiences. Cox, Abramson, Devine, and Hollon are concerned with the ways in which social stereotypes are often internalized, creating negative self-stereotypes that then produce depressive symptoms.

Unlike the theory of "deprejudice", a psychogeographical theory of depression attempts to broaden study of the subject beyond an individual experience to one produced on a societal scale, seeing particular manifestations of depression as rooted in dispossession; historical legacies of genocide, slavery, and colonialism are productive of segregation, both material and psychic material deprivation, and concomitant circumstances of violence, systemic exclusion, and lack of access to legal protections. The demands of navigating these circumstances compromise the resources available to a population to seek comfort, health, stability, and sense of security. The historical memory of this trauma conditions the psychological health of future generations, making psychogeographical depression an intergenerational experience as well. 
 
This work is supported by recent studies in genetic science which has demonstrated an epigenetic link between the trauma suffered by Holocaust survivors and the genetic reverberations for subsequent generations. Likewise, research by scientists at Emory University suggests that memories of trauma can be inherited, rendering offspring vulnerable to psychological predispositions for stress disorders, schizophrenia, and PTSD.

Vacant lot greening and mood 

A 2018 study asked low income residents of Philadelphia "how often they felt nervous, hopeless, restless, depressed and worthless." As an experimental mental health intervention, trash was removed from vacant lots. Some of the vacant lots were "greened", with plantings of trees, grass, and small fences. Residents near the "greened" lots who had incomes below the poverty line reported a decrease in feelings of depression of 68%, while residents with incomes above the poverty line reported a decrease of 41%. Removing trash from vacant lots without installing landscaping did not have an observable mental health impact.

See also
 Collective trauma
 Historical trauma

References

Depression (mood)